Arthrobacter subterraneus is a species of bacteria. It is pale yellow-pigmented, Gram-positive, short rod- or coccus-shaped (diameter between 0.8–1 µm). It is non-motile and non-spore-forming.

References

Further reading
Whitman, William B., et al., eds. Bergey's manual of systematic bacteriology. Vol. 5. Springer, 2012.

External links

LPSN
Type strain of Arthrobacter subterraneus at BacDive -  the Bacterial Diversity Metadatabase

Micrococcaceae
Psychrophiles